The 2001–02 NCAA Division III men's ice hockey season began on October 19, 2001 and concluded on March 16 of the following year. This was the 29th season of Division III college ice hockey.

The NCAA expanded the tournament to nine teams. They did this to allow both the east and the west to each receive one at-large bid. The new tournament alignment had all three western teams playing in one quarterfinal (with a First Round game between the 2nd- and 3rd-ranked teams) while the six eastern teams were arranged over the other three quarterfinal series.

Regular season

Season tournaments

Standings

Note: Mini-game are not included in final standings

2002 NCAA Tournament

Note: * denotes overtime period(s)Note: Mini-games in italics

See also
 2001–02 NCAA Division I men's ice hockey season

References

External links

 
NCAA